Asian records in the sport of track cycling are ratified by the Asian Cycling Confederation (ACC).

Men's records

Women's records 

* In 2013, the 3000m team pursuit, 3 rider format was replaced by the UCI with a 4000m team pursuit, 4 person format.

References

External links
Asian Cycling Confederation

Cycle racing in Asia
Track cycling records